Ministry of Cultural Affairs can refer to:

Ministry of Cultural Affairs (Albania)
Ministry of Cultural Affairs (Bangladesh)
Ministry of Cultural Affairs (Japan)
Ministry of Cultural Affairs, Internal Affairs and Regional Development (Sri Lanka)

See also 

Minister of culture